Magnolia pterocarpa is a species of tree in the Magnoliaceae family that grows in South Asia.

Description
The trees are evergreen. The young branchlets are pubescent. The leaves are petiolate, petiole 2–5 cm long, lamina obovate-oblong, obtuse or subacute at the apex, attenuated at the base, coriaceous, glabrous and shiny above, rusty tomentose beneath when young. Its flowers are white, fragrant with 9 Tepals. The outer 3 are sepaloid, green outside, greenish-white inside, while the inner 6 are petaloid. Stamens are numerous, and the filaments are short. Gynoecium ovoid. The fruiting receptacles are ellipsoid, c. 15 × 7 cm, ripe carpels oblong, beaked, and feathery. It has 2 orange seeds. Flowering and fruiting happen from April–November.

Distribution and habitat
Tropical and subtropical forests. It is found in Bangladesh, India, and Nepal.

References

pterocarpa
Flora of Assam
Flora of Sikkim
Flora of Nepal